A Better Tomorrow 2018, is a Chinese action film directed by Ding Sheng and starring Wang Kai, Ma Tianyu, Wang Talu, Yu Ailei, Lam Suet and  Wu Yue. In this remake of John Woo’s 1986 classic, director Ding Sheng delivers a similar story but with a different setting. Filming took place in a seaside location in the Northern Chinese city of Qingdao, and Japan.

The film was invited to be the closing film at the CinemAsia Film Festival in Netherlands on March 11, 2018. Also, the film had screenings at Osaka Asian Film Festival in Japan, Newcastle International Film Festival in United Kingdom, and Far East Film Festival in Italy. 
 
A Better Tomorrow 2018 premiered in China on January 18, 2018.

Synopsis
Zhou Kai (Wang Kai) heads a smuggling ring that ships goods from a coastal Chinese city to Japan. He has a younger brother, idealistic rookie cop Zhou Chao (Ma Tianyu), who knows nothing about his shady dealings. When Kai’s refusal to turn to narcotics creates a rift in the team, the insidious Rubberband sets Kai up on a deal that ends with his arrest. Three years later, Kai is released from prison and tries to live a quiet, humble life with his former partner-in-crime, Mark (Wang Talu). However, the unforgiving eyes of his brother and society at large stop him at every step. When Kai’s former criminal associates force Kai to return to the game, Kai, Mark and Chao are put on a collision path that will end in violence.

Cast

Music 
The film score was written and composed by Lao Zi and Dou Peng, and performed by China National Symphony Orchestra  and International Master Philharmonic Orchestra.

Release 
The film premiered in China on January 18, 2018. 
The following are the release dates for each region.

The following are the released date for each festival.

Home media
A Better Tomorrow 2018 with Chinese subtitle was released on Digital HD on March 2, 2018, and A Better Tomorrow 2018 with English subtitle was released on Blu-ray and DVD on March 29, 2018.

Reception

Box office
A Better Tomorrow 2018 grossed US$10,067,151 worldwide, including  (US$9,969,143) in China. It made  during its opening weekend in China.

Critical response
A Better Tomorrow 2018 received mixed reviews.

Idarklight of Cfensi, in her positive review of the film, wrote "From some of the boldest music choices to drastic switches in tone of cinematography to one of the most interesting shootout scenes in a while, A Better Tomorrow 2018 felt like a firework so  bursting with life that  it left me too busy savoring every minute details of brilliance to think about its flaws. You can just feel how much love and thought director Ding Sheng and the cast put into every scene.  Even all the jokes avoid lazy one-liners but instead are all carefully set-up earlier to land perfectly." Pablo A. Tariman of Star Cinema praised the film and wrote, "The film delivers as a crime-action flick. The actors give their characters an earthy feel and they remain unscathed all throughout the bloodshed saga."

Conversely, LP Hugo of Asia Film Strike gave the film a negative review, wrote "A solid crime drama on its own terms, A Better Tomorrow 2018 can however not sustain comparison with the original. But despite a wavering tone, some heavy-handed references, it still manages to introduce interesting variations, and benefits from Wang Kai’s charisma." Sean Gilman of MUBI Notebook Column, wrote "There’s nothing especially unusual about a bland, over-edited and undercooked crime movie. And without the A Better Tomorrow connection Ding Sheng’s film would barely be noticed among the sea of mediocrity that is mainstream Mainland cinema."

Accolades
A Better Tomorrow 2018 received two nominations at the 4th Annual International Jackie Chan Action Movie Week, one for Best Movie Stunt and one for Best New Actor In Action for Wang Talu.

References

External links
 
 

2018 films
Chinese action films
Chinese crime drama films
2010s crime drama films
Sparkle Roll Media films
Films directed by Ding Sheng
Yakuza films
2018 drama films
2010s Mandarin-language films
2010s Japanese films